The Northern Cemetery in Rostov-on-Don is a cemetery in Rostov-on-Don, Russia. The cemetery is the largest cemetery by area in the European part of Russia and is also one of the largest cemeteries in the whole of Europe.

History 
The cemetery was established in 1972. It occupies an area of over 400 hectares and has more than 500,000 graves. It is quickly expanding: as of 2009, there were 355,034 graves on the area of 355 hectares. On its territory there also operates a crematorium, but the majority of the relatives of the dead prefer traditional burial ritual. Northern Cemetery is also a place for Holy Protection Church and a chapel, a columbarium, administrative buildings and some firms that are engaged in manufacture of gravestones.

The cemetery is constantly expanding. In summer there can be up to 50 burials a day, and that makes a serious problem as there is not much free space left. Some experts say that in future more relatives of the deceased will have to resort to cremation.

At 300 meters from the south-eastern tip of the cemetery there are situated "Auchan" and "Leroy-Merlin" shopping malls. In the south-western side of the cemetery (outside the fence) there is an illegal burial place for pets.

Luxury quarters near the entrance to the cemetery is under constant video and guards surveillance who prevent from acts of vandalism and destruction of tombs and monuments.

Computer data base of the cemetery administration gives the possibility to search for graves that date from December 1974.

Famous people buried at the cemetery 
 Vladislav Andrianov (1951—2009) — Soviet and Russian singer, a member of vocal and instrumental ensemble "Leisya, pesnya".
 Mikhail Bushnov (1923—2014) — Soviet and Russian film and theater actor, theater director, teacher and People's Artist of the USSR (1985)
 Iosif Vorovich (1920—2001) — Soviet and Russian mathematician, academician of the Russian Academy of Sciences.
 German Dizhechko (1962—2008) — Russian rock musician, the founder of "Matrosskaya Tishina" music band.
 Kim Nazaretov (1936—1993) — Russian pianist and jazz musician.
 Valentin Nikolayev (1924—2004) — Soviet wrestler, Olympic champion, Honored Master of Sports.
 Tatiana Ozhigova (1944—1989) — Soviet stage actress, People's Artist of the RSFSR.
 Alexander Pechersky (1909—1990) — Red Army officer, the leader of the only successful uprising in a concentration camp during the Second World War.
 Vasily Slepchenko (1962—1991) — Russian artist, member of "Art or Death" artists association.
 Gennadiy Tsypkalov (1973—2016) — A statesman of the Luhansk People's Republic, Prime Minister from 26 August 2014 to 26 December 2015.
 Gurgen Shavtoryan (1919—1975) — Soviet Greco-Roman wrestler, World champion.

Gallery

References 

Cemeteries in Rostov-on-Don
Burial monuments and structures